Show Me Your Love is a 2016 Hong Kong drama film directed by Ryon Lee and starring Nina Paw and Raymond Wong.

Plot

While planning to move to Guangzhou with his wife, Hong Kong teacher Nin (Raymond Wong) is forced to return to his childhood home in Malaysia after the death of his aunt. Upon returning he is reunited with his mother Sze-nga (Nina Paw) whom he left behind after going to university in Hong Kong.

Cast
Raymond Wong as Nin, a successful teacher
Ivana Wong as Sau-lan, Nin's wife
Nina Paw as Sze-nga, Nin's estranged mother
Michelle Wai
Li Fung
Chan On-ying
Steve Yap

See also
 Sundown syndrome

Awards and nominations

References

External links

Hong Kong drama films
Malaysian drama films
2016 drama films
Drama films based on actual events
Films about old age
Cantonese-language Malaysian films
2010s Hong Kong films